The Imagine Children's Museum is a non-profit children's museum located in Everett, Washington, near Seattle.

History

The museum was founded in 1991 as the Children's Museum of Snohomish County, as part of a countywide initiative to establish children-oriented places in Snohomish County by the county government's Children's Commission. It opened in 1993 at a storefront in nearby Marysville, but was forced to move to a temporary space in downtown Everett in 1995. The county government planned to locate the museum permanently at McCollum Park in Mill Creek, but plans fell through during the late 1990s, leading to a donation by the Schack family to fund a permanent museum in downtown Everett.

In its first year at the expanded location, the museum reported an attendance of 146,000, more than quadruple its annual attendance at its temporary locations.

In 2020, the museum announced plans for a four-story expansion that would add  in the southern parking lot. The expansion project, which would cost $25 million, is planned to open in 2022 and include exhibits on woodland habitats, a puppet theater stage, and an outdoor construction crane.

Exhibits and programs

The Imagine Children's Museum is designed as an activity center for children between the ages of one and twelve years, with over 20 exhibits. Some of the exhibits are reflective of life in Snohomish County, including a child-sized airplane cockpit, a bus donated by Everett Transit, and a theater stage. The museum's rooftop was converted into an outdoor playground in 2005, including a two-story wooden tower, climbing wall and other play areas.

References

External links

Museums in Snohomish County, Washington
Children's museums in Washington (state)
Buildings and structures in Everett, Washington
Tourist attractions in Everett, Washington